Colobodesmus is a genus of millipedes in the family Sphaeriodesmidae.

References

Polydesmida
Animals described in 1905
Millipedes of Central America